Ferroelasticity is a phenomenon in which a material may exhibit a spontaneous strain. Usually, a crystal has two or more stable orientational states in the absence of mechanical stress or electric field, i.e. remanent states, and can be reproducibly switched between states by the application of mechanical stress. In ferroics, ferroelasticity is the mechanical equivalent of ferroelectricity and ferromagnetism. When stress is applied to a ferroelastic material, a phase change will occur in the material from one phase to an equally stable phase, either of different crystal structure (e.g. cubic to tetragonal), or of different orientation (a 'twin' phase). This stress-induced phase change results in a spontaneous strain in the material.

The shape memory effect and superelasticity are manifestations of ferroelasticity. Nitinol (nickel titanium), a common ferroelastic alloy, can display either superelasticity or the shape-memory effect at room temperature, depending on the nickel-to-titanium ratio.

See also 
Ferroics
Multiferroic
Flexoelectricity

Further reading 
  

Materials science
Hysteresis